Preah Vesandor is a 1993 musical movie starring Tep Rundaro, Pisith Pilika, Oum Sovanny, Ampor Tevi and other stars of the time.

Soundtrack

Cast
Tep Rundaro
Prum Sovuthy
Oum Sovanny
Pisith Pilika
Yuthara Chany
Hong Poly Maktura
Ampor Tevi
Neay Kuy
Hok Leakenna
Keo Koliyan
Neary Roth Kunthea
Jum Reksmey
Yuos Bovannak

References

Cambodian drama films
1993 films
Khmer-language films